The Goalie's Anxiety at the Penalty Kick is a 1970 short novel by the Austrian Nobel prize winning writer Peter Handke. It was adapted into a 1972 film with the same title, directed by Wim Wenders.

See also
 1970 in literature
 Austrian literature

References

1970 Austrian novels
Austrian novels
German-language novels
Novels by Peter Handke
Austrian novels adapted into films
Novels about association football
Suhrkamp Verlag books